Gateacre (for Woolton) railway station was located on the North Liverpool Extension Line on the north side of Belle Vale Road, Gateacre, Liverpool, England. Next door was the Black Bull public house which still stands.

Official maps, tickets, timetables, a large exterior station sign and platform nameboards variously refer to the station as "Gateacre", "Gateacre, for Woolton", "Gateacre for Woolton" and "Gateacre & Woolton". "Gateacre" is pronounced "Gattiker."

The station had outlived those on the same line north of Aintree by twenty years and all the remainder by twelve years when it closed to passengers on 15 April 1972. It had latterly been the suburban terminus of the sole residual service from Liverpool Central (High Level).  It was planned that the station would reopen as the southern terminus of Merseyrail's Northern Line.  This never occurred, with  becoming the terminus. The tracks through the station site were used for freight trains to Liverpool Docks until 1975. They were lifted in early 1979.

By 2015 the trackbed though the station site formed part of the Trans Pennine Trail.

References

Sources

External links

Former Cheshire Lines Committee stations
Disused railway stations in Liverpool
Railway stations in Great Britain opened in 1879
Railway stations in Great Britain closed in 1972